Perkins Eastman is an international architecture, interior design, urban design, planning, landscape architecture, graphic design, and project management firm. Headquartered in New York City, the firm is led by founding Principals Bradford Perkins and Mary-Jean Eastman.

History 
The history of Perkins Eastman goes back more than a century, when Co-Founder and Chairman Brad Perkins’ grandfather, Dwight Heald Perkins, started an architecture firm in 1897. Dwight later received commissions for the design of two universities in China. Brad’s father, Lawrence Bradford Perkins, would go on to form to the global firm Perkins+Will. Bradford Perkins met his future Perkins Eastman co-founder, Mary-Jean Eastman, in the late 1970s when they were both working on New York City's bid to host the 1984 Summer Olympics -- Perkins was with the joint venture of Davis Brody and Llewelyn-Davies International while Eastman was working in tandem for the State of New York. When Los Angeles won the bid, Eastman went to work for Davis Brody briefly, while Perkins joined Perkins&Will in 1977 as the managing principal of its East Coast offices. Eastman followed Perkins there in 1978 as the studio leader of its New York office. 

In 1981, Perkins and Eastman left Perkins&Will and partnered with Eli Attia to form Attia & Perkins. In 1984, Perkins bought out Attia's interest and reorganizes the firm as Bradford Perkins & Associates. By 1985, Perkins and Eastman partnered with Barbara Geddis, and the name changed to Perkins Geddis Eastman. Geddis stepped down in 1991, and the firm became Perkins Eastman. 

By offering architecture, interior design, planning, and strategic-consulting services, the firm has grown to more than 1,000 employees and 22 studios around the world. Its commissions have spanned more than 60 countries and won more than 800 awards along the way.  Practice areas of the firm include: arts & culture; commercial/office; government; healthcare; higher education; historic renovation and adaptive reuse; hospitality, K-12 education, large-scale mixed-use; libraries; residential; retail and entertainment; science and technology; senior living; sports and exhibition; and transportation and infrastructure.

Leadership 
In addition to Bradford Perkins and Mary-Jean Eastman, the firm is led by other Principals and Executive Directors: CEOs Andrew Adelhardt, Shawn Basler, and Nicholas Leahy; CFO Paul Grillo; and executive directors Jeffrey Brand; Erich A. Burkhart; and Jason Haim. 

On January 25, 2019, the company named Basler, Leahy and General Counsel Andrew Adelhardt III as co-CEOs.

Growth and expansion 
The firm has expanded greatly, in both practice-area expertise and geographic locations, over the past 30 years, mainly by merging with other architecture, planning and design firms: 

1994: Quick Ledewitz

1996: Sherwood Mills & Smith

1998: BFJ Planning

1999: Susan Black Architects 

2000: Basler Mosa Design Group

2001: MedArc LLC; OWP/P Senior Living Group

2002: Van Summern Group; Roesch Landscape

2004: Healthcare Interiors Inc. 

2005: Akol Architects; Larsen Schein Ginsberg Snyder

2006: Urbanomics

2007: Liebman Melting Partnership

2011: Ehrenkrantz, Eckstut & Kuhn

2011: Janson & Tsai

2011: S9 Architecture

2015: Lee, Burkhart, Liu (LBL Architects)

2016: ForrestPerkins; Design Partnership of Cambridge

2018: Dougherty & Dougherty; Packard Design, Inc. 

2021: Pfeiffer Architects; VIA; MEIS

Today, Perkins Eastman is the second largest New York-based design firm per Crain’s New York Business, the tenth largest architectural firm in the United States according to the Architectural Record, and the fourth largest architecture firm in the world by revenue according to Building Design + Construction. 

Beyond its New York headquarters, the firm maintains domestic offices in: Pittsburgh (1994); Stamford, Connecticut (1998); Charlotte, North Carolina (2001); Chicago (2002); San Francisco (2002); Washington, DC (2006); Boston (2007); Los Angeles (2015); Dallas (2016); Costa Mesa, California (2018); Oakland, California (2018); Raleigh, North Carolina (2020); Austin (2021); Providence, Rhode Island (2021); and Seattle (2021). Internationally, Perkins Eastman operates in Toronto (1999); Shanghai (2005); Dubai, United Arab Emirates (2007); Guayaquil, Ecuador (2008); Mumbai (2008); and Vancouver (2021).

References 

"Perkins Eastman, Studios Architecture and Arrowstreet Collaborate on VYV Residential Complex in Jersey City," Interior Design, April 28, 2021
"See Inside Clinics Designed for COVID-19 Long Haulers," Fast Company, March 24, 2021
"With Hotel-Like Amenities, the New Stanford Hospital Streamlines Patient Experience," Metropolis, July 31, 2020
"Compassion Takes on Physical Form at a Memorial Sloan Kettering Cancer Center in New York," Interior Design, June 16, 2020
"Perkins Eastman's New Studio in Chicago's Rookery Honors Old and New," Interior Design, June 13, 2019
"Mary-Jean Eastman Helps Pave the Way for Women in Architecture," Interiors and Sources, March 7, 2019
"A New DC Neighborhood Built Anew Without Seeming Prefab," New York, January 2019
"The Tenement Museum Adds New Exhibition Space," Architectural Record, Feb. 20, 2018
"Reinventing Cancer Surgery-By Designing a Better Hospital Experience," Fast Company, Dec. 3, 2015
"Sheikh Khalifa Project Brings Specialty Care to UAE," Healthcare Design, Nov. 13, 2013
"The 30-Minute Interview: Bradford Perkins," New York Times, Feb. 26, 2013
"When the City Became a Stage" - TKTS Booth named building of the decade, New York, Dec. 2, 2009
"Despite space and budget constraints, Concordia International School Shanghai embraces a community feeling," Architectural Record, Jan. 1, 2008
"Perkins Eastman: Raising the Bar in Healthcare" Healthcare World, January 2008
"For Queens, A Civil Civl Court" New York Times, Sept. 21, 1997

External links 
 Human by Design

Architecture firms of the United States
Companies based in New York City
Architecture firms based in New York City